Luni (also spelled as Loni) is one of the tribes of Pashtuns, mainly living in Pakistan.

Population

 Loni had a population of 982,435. Out of which males constitute 54% of the population and females 46%. Luni has an average literacy rate of 23%, lower than the national average of 35%.

Notable members
Arman Loni
Wranga Loni

References

External links
 Luni tribe

Social groups of Pakistan
Durrani Pashtun tribes